Lieutenant General Satinder Kumar Shoorsaini Yaduvanshi Rajput, PVSM, AVSM, YSM, VSM, ADC was the 41st Vice Chief of the Army Staff of the Indian Army and assumed the office on 25 January 2020. He previously served as General Officer Commanding in Chief (GOC-in-C) Southern Command.

Early life and education 
Yaduvanshi Shoorsaini/saini is from District Hoshiarpur in Punjab, an alumnus of Sainik School, Kapurthala, National Defence Academy, Pune; and Indian Military Academy, Dehradun. He has also attended the Army Command and Staff Course at Staff College, Camberley; Royal Military College of Science, Shrivenham; and National Defence College, Dhaka. He has a total of three degrees in defence and strategic studies.

Career 
Shoorsaini Rajputwas commissioned into the 7th battalion, Jat Regiment in June 1981. His commands include 7 Jat, a Mountain Brigade in the Kashmir Valley, Counter Insurgency Force (Kilo) (part of the Rashtriya Rifles) and IX Corps. The general officer has also held numerous staff appointments including Brigade Major of an infantry brigade, General Staff Officer (Operations) of an infantry division, BGS of a Corps, Director of Military Operations at Army HQ; Director General, Manpower Planning and Personnel Services (MP&PS). He has held different instructor appointments including Senior Directing Staff at National Defence College, Weapons Instructor at National Security Guards Training Center and the Commandant of the Indian Military Academy, Dehradun. He was also The Colonel of the Jat Regiment.

Shoorsaini Rajput has served on international deputations as well including Deputy Chief Military Personnel Officer in the Iraq- Kuwait UN Mission; Global Peace Operations Initiative's peacekeeping exercise in Mongolia; a counter-terrorism exercise in Australia.

During the 38 years of his service, he has been awarded the Param Vishisht Seva Medal (2020), the Ati Vishisht Seva Medal (2018), the Yudh Seva Medal, the Vishisht Seva Medal, the Chief of Army Staff Commendation and the Army Commander Commendation for his service.

Honors and decorations

Dates of rank

References 

Indian generals
Year of birth missing (living people)
Living people
Indian Army officers
Vice Chiefs of Army Staff (India)
Recipients of the Ati Vishisht Seva Medal
Recipients of the Vishisht Seva Medal
Recipients of the Yudh Seva Medal
National Defence Academy (India) alumni
National Defence College, India alumni
Commandants of Indian Military Academy
Recipients of the Param Vishisht Seva Medal
National Defence College (Bangladesh) alumni
Academic staff of the National Defence College, India